The United States Arena Curling Championships are annual national curling championships for men and women that are members of arena curling clubs. Arena curling clubs do not have their own facilities and instead rent ice time at traditional ice arenas. The tournament is run by the United States Curling Association.

The 2019 Arena Curling Championships were held May 5-11, 2019 in West Chester, Pennsylvania, making West Chester the first site to hold the Arena Championships more than once. 

The 2020 Arena Curling Championships were set to be held April 26 to May 2, 2020 at the Wyoming Center Spirit Hall Ice Arena in Gillette, Wyoming. But they were cancelled due to the COVID-19 pandemic, with Gillette instead getting the opportunity to host the Arena Curling Championships in 2022.

Past champions

Men

Women

References

External links 

 USCA Arena Nationals website
 List of Past Champions
 2018 Men's Curling Zone website
 2018 Women's Curling Zone website

Curling competitions in the United States
Curling in the United States